Fallada: The Last Chapter is a 1988 East German drama film directed by Roland Gräf about the life of Hans Fallada. It was entered into the 39th Berlin International Film Festival.

Cast
 Jörg Gudzuhn as Hans Fallada
 Jutta Wachowiak as Anna Fallada
 Katrin Saß as Ursula Losch
 Corinna Harfouch as Else-Marie Bukonje
 Ulrike Krumbiegel as Anneliese
 Marga Legal as Falladas Mutter
 Hermann Beyer as Abteilungsleiter
 Carl Heinz Choynski as Paselk, Wächter
 Werner Dissel as Doktor
 Werner Godemann as Gendarm
 Peter-Mario Grau as Journalist
 Aleksei Yakubov as Kleiner Offizier
 Werner Kos as Journalist
 Joachim Lätsch as August

References

External links

1988 films
1980s biographical films
German biographical films
East German films
1980s German-language films
Films directed by Roland Gräf
Biographical films about writers
Films about alcoholism
Films set in the 1940s
1980s German films